Gloaming may refer to:

 Twilight, the period after sunset and before the darkness of night 
 The Gloaming, an Irish traditional music group
The Gloaming (album), their first album
 Gloaming (horse) (1915–1932), a Thoroughbred racehorse
 The Gloaming (TV series), a 2019 Australian web TV series
 The Gloaming, the subtitle of Radiohead's album Hail to the Thief and the title of one of its tracks

See also

In the Gloaming (disambiguation)
"Roamin' in the Gloamin', a song by Harry Lauder